
Riffelsee is an alpine lake above the town of Zermatt in the canton of Valais, Switzerland.

Geography 
It lies below the Riffelhorn at an elevation of 2757 m, and has a surface area of 0.45 ha.  The lake can be reached from Rotenboden railway station (2815 m) on the Gornergratbahn mountain railway.

External links

Lakes of Valais